This is a list of films which have placed number one at the weekend box office in the United Kingdom during 2021.

Films

Highest-grossing films

In-Year Release

Notes

References

External links
Weekend box office figures | BFI

2021
United Kingdom
2021 in British cinema
B